Escalation is the process of increasing or rising, derived from the concept of an escalator. Specific uses of the term include:

Cost escalation, an increase in the price of goods
Conflict escalation, an increase in the intensity of a conflict
Escalation of commitment, an aspect of game theory
Privilege escalation, a computer security process
Technological escalation, a technological version of an arms race

Entertainment 
Escalation (1968 Italian film), a 1968 Italian film
Escalation (1968 animated film), a 1968 anti-Vietnam War animated cartoon, directed by Ward Kimball
Escalation Studios, an American video game developer

See also 
De-escalation, an attempt to quell conflict